Rudolf Czipott (January 14 or June 18, 1825 in Hodoš – May 20, 1901) was a Slovene Lutheran pastor and writer in Hungary.

Early life 
His father, György Czipott, was a writer, pastor and teacher in the Slovenian town of Hodoš who was born near Murska Sobota. His mother, Erzsébet Hutter, was of German descent, the daughter of the pastor of Kukmirn (Burgenland). Czipott had two brothers: Lajos and József.

Czipott's father died in 1834. The Czipott family moved to Sopron, where Czipott studied in the Lutheran Lyceum. By 1847 Czipott studied in Vienna, where he worked as a private teacher.
In 1848 Czipott fought in the First Revolution of Vienna. After the revolution he went home and worked as a government official in Kővágóörs, near Balaton.
In 1853 Czipott and his mother moved to Vése (Somogy), Czipott's mother died in 1884.

In 1858 the pastor of Puconci Sándor Terplán died and Czipott received the parish of Puconci, until he died in 1901.

Works 
 Predga 1888-ga leta oktobra 28-ga dnéva na dén reformátzie : vu Battyándszkoj (Püczonszkoj) ev. czérkvi. : V-Szoboti (Muraszombat) : stampano z-piszkmi Grünbaum Márka, 1888.
 Predga 1883-ga leta Octobra 14-toga dneva, liki na sztotni szpoumenek nasztávlanya Püczonszkoga Szpráviscsa czérkevnoga : i zkrátkim dojszpisüvanyem prigode püczonszke gmajne. V Keszthelyi vödána na sztroski pobozsnoga gmajnara Kühar Stevana Tesanovszkoga, 1884. 20. p.
 Vcsenyé konfirmátzie. V-Szoboti (Muraszombat): Czérkevno szpráviscse püczonszko, 1888. 44. p.

See also 
 List of Slovene writers and poets in Hungary
 György Czipott

References 
 Muravidéki életrajzi lexikon
 Czipott Rudolf önéletrajza (1886. május 5.)

1825 births
1901 deaths
People from Hodoš
Slovenian Lutheran clergy
Slovenian writers and poets in Hungary
People of Hungarian German descent
Slovene Austro-Hungarians
Hungarian people of Slovenian descent